The Valea Luncanilor (also: Luncani, in its upper course: Pârâul Vânătorului) is a right tributary of the river Strei in Romania. It discharges into the Strei in Streisângeorgiu.

Tributaries
The following rivers are tributaries to the river Valea Luncanilor:

Left: Oțapu, Valea Văcăriții, Purcăreț
Right: Valea Morii, Valea Roșie, Alun, Scaiu, Bulac, Valea Bobaii, Ocoliș, Chitid, Grid

References

Rivers of Romania
Rivers of Hunedoara County